The 1946–47 Northern Football League season was the 49th in the history of the Northern Football League, a football competition in Northern England.

Clubs

The league featured 12 clubs which competed in the last season, along with two new clubs:
 Heaton Stannington
 Whitby Town, joined their name from Whitby United

League table

References

1946-47
4